Paribartan is a Rural municipality located within the Rolpa District of the Lumbini Province of Nepal.
The rural municipality spans  of area, with a total population of 20,778 according to a 2011 Nepal census.

On March 10, 2017, the Government of Nepal restructured the local level bodies into 753 new local level structures.
The previous Kureli, Rangsi, Rangkot, Iriwang and Pachhawang VDCs were merged to form Paribartan Rural Municipality.
Paribartan is divided into 6 wards, with Rangkot declared the administrative center of the rural municipality.

This rural municipality was named Duikholi Rural Municipality during establishment but later renamed as Paribartan.

Demographics
At the time of the 2011 Nepal census, Paribartan Rural Municipality had a population of 20,778. Of these, 89.8% spoke Nepali, 9.9% Magar, 0.2% Kham and 0.1% Maithili as their first language.

In terms of ethnicity/caste, 50.5% were Magar, 35.7% Chhetri, 8.1% Kami, 3.3% Damai/Dholi, 1.1% Thakuri, 0.4% Badi, 0.3% Hill Brahmin, 0.3% Sanyasi/Dasnami, 0.2% Newar and 0.1% others.

In terms of religion, 81.8% were Hindu, 16.5% Buddhist, 1.5% Christian, 0.1% Prakriti and 0.1% others.

References

External links
official website of the rural municipality

Rural municipalities in Rolpa District
Rural municipalities of Nepal established in 2017